Tom Alan Robbins (born March 29, 1954) is an American actor known for his roles in theatre and television.

Early life and education 
Born and raised in Canton, Ohio, Robbins graduated from Lehman High School. He earned a bachelor's degree from the Juilliard School as a member of Group Six.

Career 
Tom has performed in eight Broadway shows, including The Lion King in which he created the role of Pumbaa. He played Thenardier in the first national tour of Les Misérables. Off-Broadway productions include Little Shop of Horrors (2020 revival), Brooklynite, On the Verge (New York Premiere), Isn't It Romantic (World Premiere), The Cradle Will Rock, The Rise and Rise of Daniel Rocket (World Premiere), Henry V (Public Theatre), King Lear (Cornwall), and "On The Air, A Nostalgiaspoof Review of the Golden Age of Radio" (Van Buren's New York Premiere). Robbins also appeared in regional productions of The Whale (Charlie, World Premiere), A Midsummer Night's Dream (Bottom), Fiddler on the Roof (Tevye), The Producers (Franz). Man of La Mancha (Sancho), My Name Is Asher Lev, and Taming of the Shrew (Tranio).

Robbins appeared in episodes of The Good Wife, Seinfeld, NYPD Blue, Law & Order and Baby Talk (as series regular Dr. Elliot Fleisher).

Robbins is also a writer. His first play, The Joke the Rabbit Told Me, won the NAAA Playreading competition in London and received a reading at the Tristan Bates Theatre in the West End. His play, Muse, won the 2019 New Works of Merit Playwriting Contest and received a reading at the Playroom Theatre in New York.

Filmography

Film

Television

Awards and nominations

References

External links

American male television actors
American male film actors
American male stage actors
Living people
Juilliard School alumni
1954 births